Synergistic Software was a video game developer based in Seattle. Founded in 1978, the company published some of the earliest available games and applications for the Apple II family of computers. They continued developing games for various platforms into the late 1990s.

History
Synergistic was founded in 1978 by Robert Clardy and Ann Dickens Clardy. They developed the Dungeons & Dragons-inspired Dungeon Campaign / Wilderness Campaign game, which was later expanded and repackaged as Odyssey: The Compleat Apventure.

Synergistic also published a number of business applications, including a word processor and simple database program, called The Modifiable Database.

Synergistic was acquired by Sierra On-Line in 1996. They maintained their identity as an independent development group within Sierra until the studio was closed on February 22, 1999.

Software
Campaign-Adventure series
Dungeon Campaign (1978) 
Wilderness Campaign (1979)
Odyssey: The Compleat Apventure (1980)
Apventure to Atlantis (1982)
World Builders engine series
War in Middle Earth (1988)
Spirit of Excalibur (1990)
Vengeance of Excalibur (1991)
Conan: The Cimmerian (1991)
Warriors of Legend (1993)
Non-games
Higher Text II (1980)
Data Reporter (1981)
Other games
Escape from Arcturus (1981)
Bolo (1982)
Crisis Mountain (1982)
Probe One: The Transmitter (1982)
Microbe (1983)
The Fool's Errand (1986), MS-DOS port
Pitstop II (1984), Atari 8-bit port
Thexder (1985), MS-DOS port
Rockford (1988)
SideWinder (1988)
Silpheed (1988), MS-DOS & Apple IIGS ports

The Third Courier (1989)
Low Blow (1990)
The Beverly Hillbillies (1993)
Homey D. Clown (1993)
Spectre  (1994)
Triple Play '97 (1996)
Birthright - The Gorgon's Alliance (1997)
Diablo: Hellfire (1997)

References

External links
Synergistic Software at MobyGames

Defunct companies based in Washington (state)
Sierra Entertainment
Defunct video game companies of the United States
Video game development companies
Companies based in Bellevue, Washington
Video game companies established in 1978
Video game companies disestablished in 1999
1978 establishments in Washington (state)
1999 disestablishments in Washington (state)